Tamil Nadu State Highway 71 (SH-71) is a State Highway maintained by the Highways Department of Government of Tamil Nadu. It connects Musiri (Tiruchirappalli district) with Sethubavachathiram (Thanjavur district) in  Tamil Nadu.

Route
The route is from MusiriSethubavachathiram, via Kulithalai, Pudukkottai and Alangudi.

The main towns through which this highway passes are:

 Kulithalai
 Thogaimalai
 Manapparai
 Viralimalai
 Iluppur
 Annavasal
 Pudukkottai
 Alangudi
 Aavanam Kaikatti
 Peravurani

See also 
 Highways of Tamil Nadu

References 

State highways in Tamil Nadu
Road transport in Tiruchirappalli